1976–77 FIS Alpine Ski Europa Cup was the 6th season of the FIS Alpine Ski Europa Cup.

Standings

Overall

Downhill

Giant Slalom

Slalom

References

External links
 

FIS Alpine Ski Europa Cup